Thomas Shelton may refer to:
 Thomas Shelton (translator), translator of Don Quixote
 Thomas Shelton (stenographer) (died 1650), English stenographer
 Thomas Shelton (gospel singer) (born 1958), Southern gospel musician
 Thomas Shelton (aircraft constructor)

See also
Thomas Skelton (disambiguation), common alternative spelling for Shelton in medieval/early modern period